This article provides information on candidates who stood for the 2012 Queensland state election on 24 March 2012.

Retiring Members

Labor
 Julie Attwood (Mount Ommaney) — announced 16 January 2012
 Desley Boyle (Cairns) — announced 17 February 2011
 Paul Lucas (Lytton) — announced 15 September 2011
 Carolyn Male (Pine Rivers) — announced 3 February 2012
 John Mickel (Logan) — announced 10 August 2011
 Lindy Nelson-Carr (Mundingburra) — announced 28 March 2011
 Neil Roberts (Nudgee) — announced 12 December 2011 
 Stephen Robertson (Stretton) — announced 27 March 2011
 Robert Schwarten (Rockhampton) — announced 17 February 2011
 Judy Spence (Sunnybank) — announced 15 December 2010

LNP
 Mike Horan (Toowoomba South) — announced 26 March 2011

Independent
 Dorothy Pratt (Nanango) — announced 15 April 2011

Legislative Assembly
Sitting members are shown in bold text. Successful candidates are highlighted in the relevant colour. Where there is possible confusion, an asterisk (*) is also used.

Unregistered parties and groups
Some parties and groups that did not qualify for registration with the Electoral Commission of Queensland nevertheless endorsed candidates, who appeared on the ballot papers as independent or unaffiliated candidates.
 The Queensland Party endorsed Ruth Bonnett in Brisbane Central and David Thomson in Nanango.
The Democratic Labor Party endorsed Rowan Harrip in Coomera.
The Socialist Alliance endorsed Jason Briskey in Dalrymple, Mike Crook in Sandgate and Liam Flenady in South Brisbane.
The North Queensland Party endorsed Mike Squire in Barron River, John Piva in Cairns and Des Connors in Hinchinbrook.
The Middle Australian Party endorsed Russell McVey in Lytton.

See also
 Members of the Queensland Legislative Assembly, 2009–2012
 Members of the Queensland Legislative Assembly, 2012–2015
 2012 Queensland state election

References
Antony Green's Guide to the 2012 Queensland state election

Candidates for Queensland state elections